This is a list of the songs that reached number-one position in official Polish single charts in 2023:
 OLiA (Official Airplay Chart), published by ZPAV
 OLiS – Streaming singles, published by ZPAV
 Poland Songs, published by Billboard (as a part of Hits of the World)

Chart history

Number-one artists

OLiA

OLiS – Streaming chart

Billboard Poland Songs

See also 
 Polish music charts
 List of number-one albums of 2023 (Poland)

Notes

References 

Poland
2023
No On